Matthew Carder (born 16 June 1993)  is a Scottish male badminton player. In 2016, he won Scottish National Badminton Championships in men's singles event.

Achievements

BWF International Challenge/Series
Men's singles

 BWF International Challenge tournament
 BWF International Series tournament
 BWF Future Series tournament

References

External links

 

1993 births
Living people
Sportspeople from Livingston, West Lothian
Scottish male badminton players